Mortimer 'Dan' Keily (16 May 1892 – 28 June 1967) was an Australian rules footballer who played for Carlton in the Victorian Football League (VFL).

Keily, a Brighton junior and former Havelock player, struggled to cement a place in a strong Carlton team which made the finals in every season that he was at the club. After missing out on the 1914 and 1915 premierships, Keily was a losing Grand Finalist in 1916. A wingman or fullback, he received a life suspension after Carlton's 1917 semi-final loss to Fitzroy for using abusive language toward a steward at the subsequent tribunal hearing. The life suspension was lifted in the second half of the 1919 season, with Keily having effectively served a 24 match ban.

References

External links

Holmesby, Russell and Main, Jim (2007). The Encyclopedia of AFL Footballers. 7th ed. Melbourne: Bas Publishing.

1892 births
Carlton Football Club players
Australian rules footballers from Melbourne
1967 deaths